The present coat of arms of Sabah is largely based on the coat of arms of the Crown Colony of North Borneo under British colonial rule and the state coat of arms first granted on 31 August 1963.

Current coat of arms of Sabah
The current coat of arms of Sabah were officially established on 16 September 1988. The two arms carrying the Sabah State Flag represents unity and harmony among its multiracial citizens towards progress and success. The state motto "Sabah Maju Jaya" means "Let Sabah Prosper".

The silhouette of Mount Kinabalu represents Sabah State.

The five different colours represent the five residencies (now divisions) of the Sabah State.
 Zircon blue colour represents peace and calmness.
 Icicle blue colour represents unity and prosperity.
 Royal blue colour represents strength and harmony.
 White colour represents purity and justice.
 Chilli red colour represents courage and determination.

Past coats of arms

City, district and municipal coat of arms

See also 
 Flag of Sabah
 Armorial of Malaysia

References

External links 
 Sabah State Government Official Website
 Flagspot.net: About Sabah

Sabah
Sabah
Sabah
Sabah
Sabah
Sabah